J. Roger Porter (1909 in Alma, Nebraska – 1979 in Iowa City, Iowa) was an internationally known microbiologist.  Porter married Majorie Ann Perkins in 1934.  He was the father of four children (Roberta, Carol, Katherine, and John).

Life and work

Porter graduated from Iowa State University, with B.S. and M.S. degrees in Bacteriology in 1933 and 1935.  He obtained his Ph.D. in Bacteriology and Chemistry from Yale University in 1938.  His career on the University of Iowa's Department of Microbiology faculty spanned the period 1938 through 1977.  He was Department Head from 1949 through his retirement in 1977, when he became an emeritus professor.  He served on 19 standing committees within the university.

He authored an important text and reference book entitled, Bacterial Chemistry and Physiology, which was published in 1946 by John Wiley and Sons.  He served as Editor-in-Chief of the Journal of Bacteriology from 1951 through 1961.  He was Chairman of the Conference of Biological Editors Committee on Form and Style from 1958 through 1964, which published the widely used Style Manual for Biological Journals.  He published 47 articles in recognized scientific journals.

Porter served in leadership positions on numerous professional and governmental committees.  Following is a selection of service:
Conference of Biology Editors, chairman, 1962–1963
American Society for Microbiology, President, 1964
American Institute of Biological Sciences, President, 1967
U.S. National Committee for International Union of Biological Sciences, chairman, 1967–1969
U.S. House of Representatives, Panel on Science and Technology, 1970–1974
U.S. Air Force, Scientific Advisory Board Committee on Disposal of Herbicide Orange, 1972–1974
Appointed by President Gerald Ford as U.S. Delegate to the 18th General UNESCO Conference, Paris, 1974
American Academy of Arts and Sciences-National Academy of Sciences, Joint Committee on UNESCO, 1976–1977
International Association of Microbiology Societies, Elected President-Elect, 1978 (to take office in 1982)
National Academy of Sciences, National Research Council, Committee on Science Programs of UNESCO, 1977–1979

Awards Received
Pasteur Award, 1961, Society of Illinois Microbiologists
Council of Biology Editors, Meritorious Award, 1973
Honorary Member, II Mechnikov All-Union Scientific Society of Microbiologists and Epidemiologists, Moscow, 1974
Distinguished Achievement Citation, Iowa State University Alumni Association, 1975
American Society for Microbiology, Honorary Member, 1979

Awards in His Name
United States Federation for Culture Collections/J. Roger Porter Award
Walter Bierring-Roger Porter Award (University of Iowa College of Medicine)

Bibliography
 Bacterial Chemistry and Physiology, John Wiley and Sons, Inc., 1946
University of Iowa Libraries

External links
University of Iowa Department of Microbiology

American microbiologists
1909 births
1979 deaths
University of Iowa faculty
Yale University alumni
Iowa State University alumni
People from Alma, Nebraska